Domnall Ua Ruairc (died 1102) was King of Connacht. Not much is known of King Domnall but it is stated that he Slew the previous king Tadg Mac Ruaidrí Ua Conchobair and defeated him in battle.

References

 Leabhar na nGenealach, Dublin, 2004–2005
 Annals of the Four Masters, ed. John O'Donovan, Dublin, 1856
 Annals of Lough Ce, ed. W.M. Hennessey, London, 1871.
 Irish Kings and High Kings, Francis John Byrne, 3rd revised edition, Dublin: Four Courts Press, 2001. 
 "Ua Ruairc", in Seán Duffy (ed.), Medieval Ireland: An Encyclopedia. Routledge. 2005. pp.

1102 deaths
Kings of Connacht
People from County Cavan
People from County Leitrim
11th-century Irish monarchs
Year of birth unknown